The Newcastle Chronicle may refer to:

 The newspaper published in Newcastle upon Tyne, now known as the Evening Chronicle
 The Newcastle Chronicle and Hunter River District News published in Newcastle, New South Wales